is a town located in Iwate Prefecture, Japan. , the town had an estimated population of 5,632, and a population density of 13 persons per km². The town uses many alternative energy sources, producing a surplus of energy, including wind power and biomass.

Geography
Kuzumaki is located in a basin in north-central Iwate Prefecture with an average elevation of 400 meters, surrounded by the 1000 meter mountains of the Kitakami Mountains. Approximately 60% of the town area is mountains and forests. The Mabechi River flows through the town.

Neighboring municipalities
Iwate Prefecture
Morioka
Kuji
Iwate
Iwaizumi
Kunohe
Ichinohe

Climate
Kuzumaki has a humid continental climate (Köppen climate classification Dfb) characterized by mild summers and cold winters.  The average annual temperature in Kuzumaki is 7.0 °C. The average annual rainfall is 1434 mm with September as the wettest month and February as the driest month. The temperatures are highest on average in August, at around 20.2 °C, and lowest in January, at around -5.1 °C.

Demographics
Per Japanese census data, the population of Kuzumaki has declined over the past 60 years. It is now about half of what it was a century ago and about a third of its peak around 1960.

History
The area of present-day Kuzumaki was part of ancient Mutsu Province. It was under the control of the Nambu clan from the Muromachi period, and was part of Hachinohe Domain under the Edo period Tokugawa shogunate. The area was noted for its horse ranches.

The villages of Kuzumaki and Ekari within Kita-Kunohe District and the village of Tabe within Iwate District were created on April 1, 1889, with the establishment of the modern municipality system. Kita-Kunohe District and Minami-Kunohe Districts merged to form Kunohe District on April 1, 1897. Kuzumaki was raised to town status on December 25, 1940. On July 1, 1948, Kuzumaki and Isashi were transferred to Iwate District. Kuzumaki annexed neighboring Ekari and Tabe on July 15, 1955.

Government
Kuzumaki has a mayor-council form of government with a directly elected mayor and a unicameral town council of 10 members. Kuzumaki, together with the city of Hachimantai and the town of Iwate, contributes two seats to the Iwate Prefectural legislature. In terms of national politics, the town is part of Iwate 2nd district of the lower house of the Diet of Japan.

Economy
The local economy is based on agriculture, including dairy products and wine production.

Education
Kuzumaki has five public elementary schools and three public middle schools operated by the town government, and one public high school operated by the Iwate Prefectural Board of Education.

Transportation

Railway
 Kuzumaki does not have any passenger railway services.

Highway
  – Kuzumaki-Kogen roadside station

References

External links

Official Website 

 
Towns in Iwate Prefecture